The Ockham New Zealand Book Awards are literary awards presented annually in New Zealand. The awards began in 1996 as the merger of two literary awards events: the New Zealand Book Awards, which ran from 1976 to 1995, and the Goodman Fielder Wattie Book Awards, which ran from 1968 to 1995 (known as the Montana Book Awards from 1994 to 1995). 

The awards have changed name several times depending on sponsorship. From 1996 to 2009, the awards were known as the Montana New Zealand Book Awards, and sponsored by Montana Wines. From 2010 until 2014, the awards were known as the New Zealand Post Book Awards. Since 2015, the main sponsors have been property developer Ockham Residential, the Acorn Foundation, Creative New Zealand, Mary and Peter Biggs, Booksellers Aotearoa New Zealand and biotech company MitoQ. The awards event is the opening event of the Auckland Writers Festival, held annually in May.

History and format
Before 1996 there were two major New Zealand literary awards events: the Goodman Fielder Wattie Book Awards (1968 to 1995, known as the Montana Book Awards from 1994 to 1995) and the New Zealand Book Awards (1976 to 1995).

The Wattie Book of the Year Award (named for Sir James Wattie) was formed in 1968, supported by the New Zealand Publishers Association and sponsored by the company Wattie's. This award was the first of its kind in New Zealand. The first recipients were John Morton and Michael Miller for The New Zealand Sea Shore. The first novel to win an award was Smith's Dream by C.K. Stead in 1972. The award became the Goodman Fielder Wattie Awards, and only had a single category covering fiction, non-fiction and other genres. In 1994 the winemaking company Montana became the sponsor and the awards were renamed to the Montana Book Awards. 

The New Zealand Book Awards were set up by the New Zealand Literary Fund, a government organisation, in 1976. Annual awards were presented for literary merit in fiction, non-fiction, poetry and (later) book production.

In 1996, the two award series were amalgamated to form the Montana New Zealand Book Awards, managed by Booksellers New Zealand (a bookselling association) and offering prizes in six categories. In 2010, the New Zealand Post took over as sponsor, having supported the New Zealand Book Awards for Children and Young Adults for the previous 14 years.

In 2015, Auckland property development firm Ockham Residential assumed sponsorship of the awards, and the New Zealand Book Awards Trust took over the governance and management. No prizes were presented in that year, and the awards were streamlined to discontinue the Book of the Year Award, the Booksellers' Choice Award and the People's Choice Award. Since the first Ockham New Zealand Book Awards in 2016, the ceremony has been held each year in May, as part of the Auckland Writers Festival. In 2020 the award winners were announced in a virtual presentation, after the Auckland Writers Festival was cancelled due to the COVID-19 pandemic.

, there are five principal prizes: fiction (currently known as the Jann Medlicott Acorn Prize for Fiction), general non-fiction (sponsored by Royal Society Te Apārangi), illustrated non-fiction, poetry (currently known as the Mary and Peter Biggs Award for Poetry) and Te Mūrau o te Tuhi Māori Language Award for books written entirely in te reo Māori. "Best First Book" prizes are awarded to first time authors in the first four categories, currently sponsored by MitoQ. Each category is judged by a panel of three judges. Winners of the Jann Medlicott Acorn Prize for Fiction receive a minimum of 55,000, and is the largest cash book prize in New Zealand. The other principal prizewinners receive 10,000 each, and the winners of the four MitoQ Best First Book awards receive 2,500.

Fiction

Fiction award
Since 2020, the top prize for fiction has been the Jann Medlicott Acorn Prize for Fiction. Between 2017 and 2019, the top prize for fiction was known as the Acorn Foundation Fiction Prize. In 2017, it was known as the Acorn Foundation Literary Award. From 1996 to 2016, it was known as the Fiction Prize.

 2022 – Whiti Hereaka, Kurangaituku. Huia Publishers
 2021 – Airini Beautrais, Bug Week & Other Stories. Victoria University Press
 2020 – Becky Manawatu, Auē. Mākaro Press
 2019 – Fiona Kidman, This Mortal Boy. Vintage, Penguin Random House
 2018 – Pip Adam, The New Animals. Victoria University Press
 2017 – Catherine Chidgey, The Wish Child. Victoria University Press
 2016 – Stephen Daisley, Coming Rain. Text Publishing
 2015 – no award due to change of sponsors
 2014 – Eleanor Catton, The Luminaries. Victoria University Press
 2013 – Kirsty Gunn, The Big Music. Faber and Faber
 2012 – Paula Morris, Rangatira. Penguin Group (NZ)
 2011 – Laurence Fearnley, The Hut Builder. Penguin Group (NZ)
 2010 – Alison Wong, As the Earth Turns Silver. Penguin Group (NZ)
 2009 – Emily Perkins, A Novel About My Wife. Bloomsbury
 2008 – Charlotte Grimshaw, Opportunity. Random House NZ
 2007 – Lloyd Jones, Mister Pip. Penguin
 2006 – Maurice Gee, Blindsight. Penguin
 2005 – Patricia Grace, Tu. Penguin Group (NZ)
 2004 – Annamarie Jagose, Slow Water. Victoria University Press
 2003 – Stephanie Johnson, The Shag Incident. Vintage Books
 2002 – Craig Marriner, Stonedogs. Vintage Books
 2001 – Lloyd Jones, The Book of Fame. Penguin Group (NZ)
 2000 – Owen Marshall, Harlequin Rex. Vintage
 1999 – Elizabeth Knox, The Vintner's Luck. Victoria University Press
 1998 – Maurice Gee, Live Bodies. Penguin Group (NZ)
 1997 – Alan Duff, What Becomes of the Broken Hearted?. Vintage
 1996 – Sheridan Keith, Zoology: A Novel. Penguin

Best first book award (fiction)
Since 2018, this award has been known as the MitoQ Best First Book Awards: Hubert Church Prize for Fiction. Between 2015 and 2018, this award was known as the Hubert Church Best First Book Award for Fiction. From 1997 to 2014, this award was known as the NZSA Hubert Church Best First Book of Fiction Prize. In 1996, this award was known as the Best First Book Award, Fiction. Prior to 1996, this award had been presented since 1945 by PEN NZ, and was named for the poet, novelist and critic Hubert Church.

 2022 – Rebecca K Reilly, Greta & Valdin. Te Herenga Waka University Press
 2021 – Rachel Kerr, Victory Park. Mākaro Press
 2020 – Becky Manawatu, Auē. Mākaro Press
 2019 – Kirsten Warner, The Sound of Breaking Glass. Mākaro Press
 2018 – Annaleese Jochems, Baby. Victoria University Press
 2017 – Gina Cole, Black Ice Matter. Huia Publishers
 2016 – David Coventry, The Invisible Mile. Victoria University Press
 2015 – no award due to change of sponsors
 2014 – Amy Head, Tough. Victoria University Press
 2013 – Lawrence Patchett, I Got His Blood on Me. Victoria University Press
 2012 – Hamish Clayton, Wulf. Penguin Group (NZ)
 2011 – Pip Adam, Everything We Hoped for. Victoria University Press
 2010 – Anna Taylor, Relief. Victoria University Press
 2009 – Eleanor Catton, The Rehearsal. Victoria University Press
 2008 – Mary McCallum, The Blue. Penguin Group (NZ)
 2007 – Rachael King, The Sound of Butterflies. Black Swan
 2006 – Gillian Ranstead, A Red Silk Sea. Penguin Group (NZ)
 2005 – Julian Novitz, My Real Life and Other Stories. Vintage
 2004 – Kelly Ana Morey, Bloom. Penguin Group (NZ)
 2003 – Paula Morris Queen of Beauty. Penguin Group (NZ)
 2002 – Craig Marriner, Stonedogs. Vintage Books
 2001 – Karyn Hay, Emerald Budgies. Vintage Books
 2000 – Duncan Sarkies, Stray Thoughts And Nosebleeds. Victoria University Press
 1999 – William Brandt, Alpha Male. Victoria University Press
 1998 – Catherine Chidgey, In a Fishbone Church. Victoria University Press
 1997 – Dominic Sheehan, Finding Home. Secker & Waburg
 1996 – Emily Perkins, Not Her Real Name. Victoria University Press

Poetry

Poetry award

Since 2020, this award has been the Mary and Peter Biggs Award for Poetry. Before 2019, this award was known as the Poetry Award.

 2022 – Joanna Preston, Tumble. Otago University Press
 2021 – Tusiata Avia, The Savage Coloniser Book. Victoria University Press
 2020 – Helen Rickerby, How to Live. Auckland University Press
 2019 – Helen Heath, Are Friends Electric?. Victoria University Press
 2018 – Elizabeth Smither, Night Horse. Auckland University Press
 2017 – Andrew Johnston, Fits & Starts. Victoria University Press
 2016 – David Eggleton, The Conch Trumpet.  Otago University Press
 2015 – no award due to change of sponsors
 2014 – Vincent O'Sullivan, Us, Then. Victoria University Press
 2013 – Anne Kennedy, The Darling North. Auckland University Press
 2012 – Rhian Gallagher, Shift. Auckland University Press
 2011 – Kate Camp, The Mirror of Simple Annihilated Souls. Victoria University Press
 2010 – Brian Turner, Just This. Victoria University Press
 2009 – Jenny Bornholdt, The Rocky Shore. Victoria University Press
 2008 – Janet Charman, Cold Snack. Auckland University Press
 2007 – Janet Frame, The Goose Bath. Vintage
 2006 – Bill Manhire, Lifted. Victoria University Press
 2005 – Vincent O'Sullivan, Nice Morning for It, Adam. Victoria University Press
 2004 – Anne Kennedy, Sing-song. Auckland University Press
 2003 – Glenn Colquhoun, Playing God. Steele Roberts
 2002 – Hone Tuwhare, Piggy-back Moon. Godwit
 2001 – Allen Curnow, The Bells of St Babel's. Auckland University Press
 2000 – Elizabeth Smither, The Lark Quartet. Auckland University Press
 1999 – Vincent O'Sullivan, Seeing You Asked. Victoria University Press
 1998 – Hone Tuwhare, Shape-Shifter. Steele Roberts
 1997 – edited by Jenny Bornholdt, Gregory O'Brien and Mark Williams, An Anthology of New Zealand Poetry in English. Oxford University Press
 1996 – Bill Manhire, My Sunshine. Victoria University Press

Best first book award (poetry)
Since 2018, this award has been the MitoQ Best First Book Awards: Jessie Mackay Prize for Poetry. Between 2015 and 2018, this award was known as the Jessie Mackay Best First Book Award for Poetry. From 1997 to 2014, this award was known as the NZSA Jessie Mackay Best First Book of Poetry Prize. In 1996, this award was known as the Best First Book Award, Poetry. Prior to 1996, this award had been presented since 1940 by PEN NZ, and was named for Jessie Mackay, New Zealand's first local-born poet.

 2022 – Nicole Titihuia Hawkins, Whai. We Are Babies Press
 2021 – Jackson Nieuwland, I Am a Human Being. Compound Press
 2020 – Jane Arthur, Craven. Victoria University Press
 2019 – Tayi Tibble, Poūkahangatus. Victoria University Press
 2018 – Hannah Mettner, Fully Clothed and So Forgetful. Victoria University Press
 2017 – Hera Lindsay Bird, Hera Lindsay Bird. Victoria University Press
 2016 – Chris Tse, How to be Dead in a Year of Snakes. Auckland University Press
 2015 – no award due to change of sponsors
 2014 – Marty Smith, Horse with Hat. Victoria University Press
 2013 – Helen Heath, Graft. Victoria University Press
 2012 – John Adams, Briefcase. Auckland University Press
 2011 – Lynn Jenner, Dear Sweet Harry. Auckland University Press
 2010 – Selina Tusitala Marsh, Fast Talking PI. Auckland University Press
 2009 – Sam Sampson, Everything Talks. Auckland University Press
 2008 – Jessica Le Bas, Incognito. Auckland University Press
 2007 – Airini Beautrais, Secret Heart. Victoria University Press
 2006 – Karlo Mila, Dream Fish Floating. Huia Publishers
 2005 – Sonja Yelich, Clung. Auckland University Press
 2004 – Cliff Fell, The Adulterer's Bible. Victoria University Press
 2003 – Kay McKenzie Cooke, Feeding the Dogs, Kay McKenzie Cooke. University of Otago Press
 2002 – Chris Price, Husk. Auckland University Press
 2001 – Stephanie de Montalk, Animals Indoors. Victoria University Press
 2000 – Glenn Colquhoun, The Art of Walking Upright. Steele Roberts
 1999 – Kate Camp, Unfamiliar Legends of the Stars. Victoria University Press
 1998 – Kapka Kassabova, All Roads Lead to the Sea. Auckland University Press
 1997 – Diane Brown, Before the Divorce We Go To Disneyland. Tandem Press
 1996 – James Brown, Go Round Power Please. Victoria University Press

General non-fiction

General non-fiction award
Since 2020, the top prize for general non-fiction has been the General Non-Fiction Award. Between 2016 and 2019, this award was known as the Royal Society Te Apārangi Award. Between 2010 and 2015, this award was known as the General Non-Fiction Prize. Between 1998 and 2009, the top prize for non-fiction was the Montana Medal for Non-Fiction. There was no top prize for general non-fiction in 1996 or 1997.

 2022 – Vincent O'Malley, Voices from the New Zealand Wars | He Reo nō ngā Pakanga o Aotearoa. Bridget Williams Books
 2021 – Vincent O'Sullivan, The Dark is Light Enough: Ralph Hotere: A Biographical Portrait. Penguin
 2020 – Shayne Carter, Dead People I Have Known. Victoria University Press
 2019 – Joanne Drayton, Hudson & Halls: The Food of Love. Otago University Press
 2018 – Diana Wichtel, Driving to Treblinka: A Long Search for a Lost Father. Awa Press
 2017 – Ashleigh Young, Can You Tolerate This? Victoria University Press
 2016 – Witi Ihimaera, Māori Boy: A Memoir of Childhood. Vintage
 2015 – no award due to change of sponsors
 2014 – Jill Trevelyan, Peter McLeavey: The life and times of a New Zealand art dealer. Te Papa Press
 2013 – Steve Braunias, Civilisation: Twenty Places on the Edge of the World. Awa Press
 2012 – Joan Druett, Tupaia: The Remarkable Story of Captain Cook’s Polynesian Navigator. Random House NZ
 2011 – Chris Bourke, Blue Smoke: The Lost Dawn of New Zealand Popular Music 1918–1964. Auckland University Press
 2010 – Judith Binney, Encircled Lands: Te Urewera, 1820–1921. Bridget Williams Books
 2009 – Jill Trevelyan, Rita Angus: An Artist’s Life. Te Papa Press
 2008 – Janet Hunt, Wetlands of New Zealand. Random House NZ
 2007 – Audrey Eagle, Eagle's Complete Trees and Shrubs of New Zealand. Te Papa Press
 2006 – Philip Simpson, Pōhutukawa & Rātā: New Zealand's Iron-hearted Trees. Te Papa Press
 2005 – Douglas Lloyd Jenkins, At Home: A Century of New Zealand Design. Godwit Press
 2004 – Anne Salmond, The Trial of the Cannibal Dog. Allen Lane / Penguin Group (NZ)
 2003 – Michael Cooper, Wine Atlas of New Zealand. Hodder Moa Beckett
 2002 – Lynley Hood, A City Possessed: The Christchurch Civic Creche Case. Longacre Press
 2001 – Michael King, Wrestling with the Angel: A Life of Janet Frame. Viking Press
 2000 – Grahame Sydney, The Art of Grahame Sydney. Longacre Press
 1999 – Heather Nicholson, The Loving Stitch: A history of knitting and spinning in New Zealand. Auckland University Press
 1998 – Harry Orsman, Dictionary of New Zealand English: A Dictionary of New Zealandisms on Historical Principles. Oxford University Press

Best first book award (general non-fiction)
Since 2019, this award has been known as the MitoQ Best First Book Awards: E H McCormick Prize for General Non-Fiction. Between 2015 and 2018, this award was known as the E H McCormick Best First Book Award for General Non-Fiction. From 1997 to 2014, this award was known as the NZSA E.H. McCormick Best First Book of Non-Fiction Prize. In 1996, this award was known as the Best First Book Award, Non-Fiction. The award is named for New Zealand historian and biographer Eric Hall McCormick.

 2022 – Dave Lowe, The Alarmist: Fifty Years Measuring Climate Change. Te Herenga Waka University Press
 2021 – Madison Hamill, Specimen: Personal Essays. Auckland University Press
 2020 – Shayne Carter, Dead People I Have Known. Victoria University Press
 2019 – Chessie Henry, We Can Make a Life. Victoria University Press
 2018 – Diana Wichtel, Driving to Treblinka: A Long Search for a Lost Father. Awa Press
 2017 – Adam Dudding, My Father’s Island. Victoria University Press
 2016 – Melissa Matutina Williams, Panguru and the City, Kāinga Tahi, Kāinga Rua: An Urban Migration History. Bridget Williams Books
 2015 – no award due to change of sponsors
 2014 – Rebecca Macfie, Tragedy at Pike River Mine. Awa Press
 2013 – Quinn Berentson, Moa: The Life and Death of New Zealand’s Legendary Bird. Craig Potton Publishing
 2012 – Michael Smythe, New Zealand by Design. Random House NZ
 2011 – Poia Rewi, Whaikōrero: The World of Māori Oratory. Auckland University Press
 2010 – Pip Desmond, Trust: A True Story of Women & Gangs. Random House NZ
 2009 – Chris Brickell, Mates & Lovers: A History of Gay New Zealand. Godwit Press
 2008 – Alan Clarke, The Great Sacred Forest of Tane. Raupo Publishing
 2007 – William Cottrell, Furniture of the New Zealand Colonial Era: An Illustrated History 1830–1900. Reed Publishing
 2006 – Patrick Snedden, Pakeha and the Treaty: Why It's Our Treaty Too. Random House NZ
 2005 – Douglas Wright, Ghost Dance. Penguin Group (NZ)
 2004 – Deidre Brown, Tai Tokerau Whakairo Rakau: Northland Maori Wood Carving. Reed Publishing
 2003 – Sam Mahon, Year of the Horse. Longacre Press
 2002 – Steve Braunias, Fool's Paradise. Random House
 2001 – Paul Tapsell, Pukaki: A Comet Returns. Reed Publishing
 2000 – Peter Thomson, Kava in the Blood. Tandem Press
 1999 – Helen Schamroth, 100 New Zealand Craft Artists. Godwit Press
 1998 – Genevieve Noser, Olives: the New Passion. Penguin Group (NZ)
 1997 – Jessie Munro, The Story of Suzanne Aubert. Auckland University Press/Bridget Williams Books
 1996 – Alex Frame, Salmond: Southern Jurist. Victoria University Press

Illustrated non-fiction

Illustrated non-fiction award
Since 2004, this award has been known as the Illustrated Non-Fiction Award. From 1996 to 2003, this award was known as the Illustrative Arts Award.

 2022 – Claire Regnault, Dressed: Fashionable Dress in Aotearoa New Zealand 1840 to 1910. Te Papa Press
 2021 – Monique Fiso, Hiakai: Modern Māori Cuisine. Godwit Press
 2020 – edited by Stephanie Gibson, Matariki Williams and Puawai Cairns, Protest Tautohetohe: Objects of Resistance, Persistence and Defiance. Te Papa Press
 2019 – Sean Mallon and Sébastien Galliot, Tatau: A History of Sāmoan Tattooing. Te Papa Press
 2018 – Alison Jones and Kuni Kaa Jenkins, Tuai: A Traveller in Two Worlds. Bridget Williams Books
 2017 – Barbara Brookes, A History of New Zealand Women. Bridget Williams Books
 2016 – Atholl Anderson, Judith Binney and Aroha Harris, Tangata Whenua: An Illustrated History. Bridget Williams Books
 2015 – no award due to change of sponsors
 2014 – Bruce Ansley & Jane Ussher, Coast: A New Zealand Journey. Godwit Press
 2013 – Gregory O'Brien & Gil Hanly, Pat Hanly. Ron Sang Publications
 2012 – John Dawson and Rob Lucas, New Zealand's Native Trees. Craig Potton Publishing
 2011 – Damian Skinner, The Passing World: The Passage of Life: John Hovell and the Art of Kowhaiwhai. Rim Books
 2010 – Al Brown, Go Fish: Recipes and stories from the New Zealand Coast. Random House NZ
 2009 – Len Castle, Len Castle: Making the Molecules Dance. Lopdell House Gallery
 2008 – Jennifer Hay, with Ron Brownson, Chris Knox, and Laurence Aberhart; designed by Aaron Beehre, Bill Hammond: Jingle Jangle Morning. Christchurch Art Gallery
 2007 – Audrey Eagle, Eagles Complete Trees and Shrubs of New Zealand. Te Papa Press
 2006 – Edited by Hannah Holm & Lara Strongman, Contemporary New Zealand Photographers. Vintage
 2005 – Luit Bieringa, Handboek: Ans Westra Photographs. BWX
 2004 – Arno Gasteiger, Central. Viking Press
 2003 – Nancy Pel & Len Castle, Len Castle: Potter. Ron Sang Publications
 2002 – Joan Whincup & Tony Whincup with Julia Parkinson (designer), Akekeia! Traditional Dance in Kiribati. Susan Barrie
 2001 – Edited by Ian Wedde, Ralph Hotere: Black Light. Te Papa Press & Dunedin Public Art Gallery
 2000 – Grahame Sydney, The Art of Grahame Sydney. Longacre Press
 1999 – Helen Schamroth, 100 New Zealand Craft Artists. Godwit Press
 1998 – Roger Blackley, Goldie. David Bateman
 1997 – edited by Sandy Adsett, Cliff Whiting and Witi Ihimaera, Mataora: The Living Face: Contemporary Maori Art. David Bateman
 1996 – Winsome Shepherd, Gold and Silversmithing in Nineteenth and Twentieth Century New Zealand. Museum of New Zealand

Best first book award (illustrated non-fiction)
Since 2020, this award has been the MitoQ Best First Book Awards: Judith Binney Prize for Illustrated Non-Fiction. From 2016 to 2019, this award was known as the Judith Binney Best First Book Award for Illustrated Non-Fiction. The award is named after the New Zealand historian Judith Binney.

 2022 – Bridget Hackshaw, The Architect and the Artists: Hackshaw, McCahon, Dibble. Massey University Press
 2021 – Monique Fiso, Hiakai: Modern Māori Cuisine. Godwit Press
 2020 – Chris McDowall and Tim Denee, We Are Here: An Atlas of Aotearoa. Massey University Press
 2019 – John Reid, Whatever it Takes: Pacific Films and John O’Shea 1948–2000. Victoria University Press
 2018 – Marcus Thomas and Neil Silverwood, Caves: Exploring New Zealand’s Subterranean Wilderness. Whio Publishing
 2017 – Ngarino Ellis, A Whakapapa of Tradition: One Hundred Years of Ngāti Porou Carving, 1830–1930. Auckland University Press
 2016 – Richard Nunns with Allan Thomas, Te Ara Puoro: A Journey into the World of Māori Music. Potton & Burton

Māori Language Award
Books that meet the general criteria of the fiction, non-fiction and poetry awards and are written wholly and originally in te reo Māori are eligible for Te Mūrau o te Tuhi – Māori Language Award. This award is made at the discretion of a specially appointed judge. Prior to 2019, Māori language awards were presented in 2008, 2009, 2012 and 2013.
 2021 – Tīmoti Kāretu, Mātāmua ko te Kupu!. Auckland University Press
2019 – Tīmoti Kāretu and Wharehuia Milroy, He Kupu Tuku Iho: Ko te Reo Māori te Tatau ki te Ao. Auckland University Press
 2013 – Dame Kāterina Te Heikōkō Mataira, Ngā Waituhi o Rēhua. Huia Publishers
 2012 – Chris Winitana, Tōku Reo, Tōku Ohooho : My Language, My Inspiration. Huia Publishers
 2009 – Maori Language Commission, He Pātaka Kupu: Te Kai a te rangatira. Raupo Press
 2008 – Edited by Huriana Raven and Piripi Walker, Te Tū a Te Toka: He Ieretanga nō ngā Tai e Whā. Totika Publishers and Toi Māori Aotearoa

Discontinued awards

Top awards

Book of the year
There have been a number of "book of the year" awards in the history of the awards. The New Zealand Post Book of the Year was presented between 2010 and 2014, when New Zealand Post was the sponsor of the awards ceremony. The Montana Medal for Fiction or Poetry was presented in 2008 and 2009. The Deutz Medal for Fiction or Poetry was presented between 1998 and 2007. The Book of the Year/Cultural Heritage Award was presented in 1996 and 1997.

 2014 – Jill Trevelyan, Peter McLeavey: The life and times of a New Zealand art dealer. Te Papa Press
 2013 – Kirsty Gunn, The Big Music. Faber and Faber
 2012 – John Dawson and Rob Lucas, New Zealand's Native Trees. Craig Potton Publishing
 2011 – Chris Bourke, Blue Smoke: The Lost Dawn of New Zealand Popular Music 1918–1964. Auckland University Press
 2010 – Judith Binney, Encircled Lands: Te Urewera, 1820–1921. Bridget Williams Books
 2009 – Emily Perkins, A Novel About My Wife. Bloomsbury
 2008 – Charlotte Grimshaw, Opportunity. Random House NZ
 2007 – Lloyd Jones, Mister Pip. Penguin
 2006 – Maurice Gee, Blindsight. Penguin
 2005 – Patricia Grace, Tu. Penguin Group (NZ)
 2004 – Annamarie Jagose, Slow Water. Victoria University Press
 2003 – Stephanie Johnson, The Shag Incident. Vintage
 2002 – Craig Marriner, Stonedogs. Vintage Books
 2001 – Lloyd Jones, The Book of Fame. Penguin Group (NZ)
 2000 – Owen Marshall, Harlequin Rex. Vintage
 1999 – Elizabeth Knox, The Vintner's Luck. Victoria University Press
 1998 – Maurice Gee, Live Bodies. Penguin Group (NZ)
 1997 – Jessie Munro, The Story of Suzanne Aubert. Auckland University Press/Bridget Williams Books
 1996 – Judith Binney, Redemption Songs – A Life of Te Kooti Arikirangi Te Turuki. Auckland University Press/Bridget Williams Books

People's choice award
The People's Choice Award was presented from 2010 to 2014. Before 2010, this award was known as the Readers' Choice Award. There were no people's choice awards in 1996 or 1997.

 2014 – Eleanor Catton, The Luminaries. Victoria University Press
 2013 – Jarrod Gilbert, Patched: The History of Gangs in New Zealand. Auckland University Press
 2012 – Sue Orr, From Under the Overcoat. Vintage, Random House NZ
 2011 – Chris Bourke, Blue Smoke: The Lost Dawn of New Zealand Popular Music 1918–1964. Auckland University Press
 2010 – Al Brown, Go Fish: Recipes and stories from the New Zealand Coast. Random House NZ
 2009 – Kate De Goldi, The 10 pm Question. Longacre Press
 2008 – Mary McCallum, The Blue. Penguin Group (NZ)
 2007 – Lloyd Jones, Mister Pip. Penguin
 2006 (joint) – Maurice Gee, Blindsight. Penguin
 2006 (joint) – Fiona Kidman, The Captive Wife. Vintage
 2005 – Julie Le Clerc and John Bougen, Made in Morocco: A Journey of Exotic Tastes and Places. Penguin Group (NZ)
 2004 – Michael King, The Penguin History of New Zealand. Penguin Group (NZ)
 2003 – Glenn Colquhoun, Playing God. Steele Roberts
 2002 – Lynley Hood, A City Possessed: The Christchurch Civic Creche Case. Longacre Press
 2001 – Michael King, Wrestling with the Angel: A Life of Janet Frame. Viking Press
 2000 – Grahame Sydney, The Art of Grahame Sydney. Longacre Press
 1999 – Elizabeth Knox, The Vintner's Luck. Victoria University Press
 1998 – Edited by Malcolm McKinnon, New Zealand Historical Atlas. David Bateman

Booksellers' choice award
The Nielsen Booksellers' Choice Award was only presented in 2013 and 2014.
 2014 – Harry Broad & Rob Suisted, Molesworth: Stories from New Zealand's largest high country station. Craig Potton Publishing
 2013 – Shaun Barnett, Rob Brown & Geoff Spearpoint, Shelter from the Storm: The story of New Zealand's backcountry huts. Craig Potton Publishing

Lifetime achievement award
The A W Reed Award for Contribution to New Zealand Literature Award was presented in 2004. From 2000 to 2002 this award was known as the A W Reed Lifetime Achievement Award.
 2004 – Joy Cowley
 2002 – Maurice Shadbolt
 2001 – Dame Fiona Kidman
 2000 – Allen Curnow

Non-fiction category awards

History
This award ended in 2009. Before 2001, a single award was given for History and Biography.

 2009 – Richard Boast, Buying the Land, Selling the Land. Victoria University Press
 2008 – Hilary Mitchell & John Mitchell, Te Tau Ihu o Te Waka Volume II: Te Ara Hou – The New Society. Huia Publishers
 2007 – Edited by K.R. Howe, Vaka Moana: Voyages of the Ancestors. David Bateman
 2006 – Rosemary McLeod, Thrift to Fantasy: Home Textile Crafts of the 1930s – 1950s. Vintage
 2005 – Douglas Lloyd Jenkins, At Home: A Century of New Zealand Design. Godwit Press
 2004 – Anne Salmond, The Trial of the Cannibal Dog. Allen Lane / Penguin Group (NZ)
 2003 – Jim McAloon, No Idle Rich: The Wealthy in Canterbury & Otago 1840 – 1914. University of Otago Press
 2002 – Lynley Hood, A City Possessed: The Christchurch Civic Creche Case. Longacre Press
 2001 – Edited by Te Miringa Hohaia, Gregory O'Brien & Lara Strongman, Parihaka: The Art of Passive Resistance. City Gallery Wellington, Trustees of Parihaka Pa & Victoria University Press
 2000 – Chris Maclean, Kapiti. The Whitcombe Press
 1998 – Harry Orsman, Dictionary of New Zealand English: A Dictionary of New Zealandisms on Historical Principles. Oxford University Press

Biography
This award ended in 2009. Before 2001, a single award was given for History and Biography.

 2009 – Jill Trevelyan, Rita Angus: An Artist’s Life. Te Papa Press
 2008 – Judy Siers, The Life and Times of James Walter Chapman-Taylor. Millwood Heritage Productions Ltd
 2007 – Philip Norman, Douglas Lilburn: His Life and Music. Canterbury University Press
 2006 – Graeme Dingle, Dingle. Vintage
 2005 – Martin Edmond, Chronicle of the Unsung. Auckland University Press
 2004 – Rachel Barrowman, Mason. Victoria University Press
 2003 – Philip Temple, A Sort of Conscience: The Wakefields. Auckland University Press
 2002 – Peter Wells, Long Loop Home. Vintage
 2001 – Michael King, Wrestling with the Angel: A Life of Janet Frame. Viking Press
 1999 – Kevin Ireland, Under the Bridge and Over the Moon. Vintage

Environment
The Environment award ended in 2009. From 1998 to 1999, this award was titled the Environment & Heritage Award. From 1996 to 1997, this award was titled the Natural Heritage Award.

 2009 – edited by Ian J. Graham, A Continent on the Move: New Zealand Geoscience into the 21st Century. Geological Society of New Zealand
 2008 – Janet Hunt, Wetlands of New Zealand. Random House NZ
 2007 – George Gibbs, Ghosts of Gondwana. Craig Potton Publishing
 2006 – Philip Simpson, Pōhutukawa & Rātā: New Zealand's Iron-hearted Trees. Vintage
 2005 – Anne Rimmer, Tiritiri Matangi: A Model of Conservation. Tandem Press
 2004 – Peter Batson, Deep New Zealand. Canterbury University Press
 2003 – Geoff Chapple, Te Araroa: The New Zealand Trail. Random House NZ
 2002 – Bob Harvey, Rolling Thunder: The Spirit of Karekare. Exisle Publishing
 2001 – Philip Simpson, Dancing Leaves: The Story of New Zealand's Cabbage Tree. Canterbury University Press
 2000 – Shaun Barnett & Rob Brown, Classic Tramping in New Zealand . Craig Potton Publishing
 1999 – Gerard Hutching, The Natural World of New Zealand. Penguin Group (NZ)
 1998 – Peter Johnson, Pick of the Bunch: New Zealand Wildflowers. Longacre Press
 1997 – John Dawson, photography by Rob Lucas, New Zealand Coast and Mountain Plants: Their Communities and Lifestyles. Victoria University Press
 1996 – Neville Peat and Brian Patrick, Wild Dunedin: The Natural History of New Zealand’s Wildlife Capital. Otago University Press

Lifestyle & Contemporary Culture
The Lifestyle & Contemporary Choice award ended in 2009. From 2000 to 2001, this award was the Lifestyle Award. From 1998 to 1999, this award was the Lives & Lifestyle Award. From 1996 to 1997, this award was the Leisure & Lifestyle Award.

 2009 – Alexa Johnston. Ladies, A Plate: Traditional Home Baking. Penguin Group (NZ)
 2008 – Ngahuia Te Awekotuku, Mau Moko: The World of Maori Tattoo. Penguin Group (NZ)
 2007 – Ann Packer, Stitch: Contemporary New Zealand Textile Artists. Random House
 2006 – Justin Paton, How to Look at a Painting. Vintage
 2005 – Gareth Shute, Hip Hop Music in Aotearoa. Reed Publishing
 2004 – John Kent & David Hallett, Classic Fly Fishing. Craig Potton Publishing
 2003 – Michael Cooper, Wine Atlas of New Zealand. Hodder Moa Beckett
 2002 – Lynnsay Rongokea & John Dalley (photographer), The Art of Tivaevae: Traditional Cook Islands Quilting. Godwit
 2001 – Julie Biuso & Ian Batchelor (photographer), Fresh. New Holland Publishers
 2000 – Yvonne Cave & Valda Paddison, The Gardener's Encyclopaedia of New Zealand Native Plants. Godwit Press
 1999 — Heather Nicholson, The Loving Stitch: A History of Knitting and Spinning in New Zealand. Auckland University Press
 1998 – Geoff Thomas, The Complete New Zealand Fisherman. David Bateman
 1997 – Michael Cooper, photography by John McDermott, The Wines and Vineyards of New Zealand. Hodder Moa Beckett
 1996 – Michael Lee-Richards, Cook!. Reed

Reference and Anthology
The Reference and Anthology award was presented between 2002 and 2009.

 2009 – C.K. Stead, Collected Poems 1951–2006. Auckland University Press
 2008 – Gregory O'Brien, A Nest of Singing Birds: 100 Years of the New Zealand School Journal. Learning Media Ltd.
 2007 – William Cottrell, Furniture of the New Zealand Colonial Era: An Illustrated History 1830–1900. Reed Publishing
 2006 – Edited by Damien Wilkins, Great Sporting Moments: The best of Sport magazine 1988 – 2004. Victoria University Press
 2005 – Edited by Tony Deverson & Graeme Kennedy, The New Zealand Oxford Dictionary. Oxford University Press
 2004 – Edited by Albert Wendt, Reina Whaitiri & Robert Sullivan, Whetu Moana. Auckland University Press
 2003 – Edited by Paul Morris, Harry Ricketts & Mike Grimshaw, Spirit in a Strange Land: A Selection of New Zealand Spiritual Verse. Godwit Press
 2002 – Hirini Moko Mead & Neil Grove, Nga Pepeha a Nga Tipuna: The Sayings of the Ancestors. Victoria University Press

Fiction runner up and Honour Awards

Fiction runner up
An award for the runner-up(s) in the Fiction category was presented from 2000 to 2009.

 2009 (joint) – Kate De Goldi, The 10 pm Question. Longacre Press
 2009 (joint) –Bernard Beckett, Acid Song. Longacre Press
 2008 – Laurence Fearnley, Edwin & Matilda. Penguin Group (NZ)
 2007 (joint) –  Damien Wilkins, The Fainter. Victoria University Press
 2007 (joint) – Nigel Cox, The Cowboy Dog. Victoria University Press
 2006 (joint) – Fiona Kidman, The Captive Wife. Vintage
 2006 (joint) – Nigel Cox, Responsibility. Victoria University Press
 2005 (joint) – C K Stead, Mansfield. Vintage Books
 2005 (joint) – Nigel Cox, Tarzan Presley. Victoria University Press
 2004 (joint) – Maurice Gee, The Scornful Moon. Penguin Group (NZ)
 2004 (joint) – Peter Wells, Iridescence. Vintage Books
 2003 (joint) – Fiona Farrell, The Hopeful Traveller. Vintage Books
 2003 (joint) – Owen Marshall, When Gravity Snaps. Vintage Books
 2002 (joint) – Elizabeth Knox, Billie's Kiss. Victoria University Press
 2002 (joint) – Lloyd Jones, Here at the End of the World We Learn To Dance. Penguin Group (NZ)
 2001 (joint) – Charlotte Randall, The Curative. Penguin Group (NZ)
 2001 (joint) – Damien Wilkins, Nineteen Widows Under Ash. Victoria University Press
 2000 (joint) – Catherine Chidgey, Golden Deeds. Victoria University Press
 2000 (joint) – C.K. Stead, Talking About O'Dwyer. Penguin Group (NZ)

Honour Award
 2002 – Te Onehou Phillis, Eruera Manuera. Huia Publishers
 1997 (fiction) – Maurice Shadbolt, Dove on the Waters. David Ling
 1997 (poetry) – J. C. Sturm, Dedications. Steele Roberts
 1996 – Pei Te Hurinui Jones, translated by Bruce Biggs, Nga Iwi o Tainui: The Traditional History of the Tainui People – Nga Koorero Tuku o Nga Tuupuna. Auckland University Press

Other awards

BPANZ Review Page or Programme Award
This award ended in 2009. Before 2006, this award was known as the Review Pages/Section of the Year Award.

 2009 – New Zealand Listener
 2008 – New Zealand Listener
 2007 – New Zealand Listener
 2006 – Dominion Post
 2005 – North & South
 2004 – New Zealand Listener
 2003 – New Zealand Listener
 2002 – North & South
 2001 – The Evening Post
 2000 – The Evening Post
 1999 – Landfall
 1998 – The Evening Post

BPANZ Reviewer of the Year Award
This award ended in 2009. Before 2006, this award was known as the Reviewer of the Year.

 2009 – David Eggleton
 2008 – Charlotte Grimshaw
 2007 – David Eggleton
 2006 – Jolisa Gracewood
 2005 – Tony Simpson
 2004 – Michael King
 2003 – David Eggleton
 2002 – Jane Hurley
 2001 – David Eggleton
 2000 – Michael King
 1999 – Iain Sharp
 1998 – Graeme Lay

See also
New Zealand Post Children's Book Awards
List of New Zealand literary awards

References

External links 
 
 Ockham New Zealand Book Awards at Christchurch City Libraries, 2016–2021, with covers and links
 New Zealand Post Book Awards at Christchurch City Libraries, 2010–2014, with covers and links
 Montana New Zealand Book Awards at Christchurch City Libraries, 1996–2009, with covers and links
 Montana Book Awards at Christchurch City Libraries, 1994–1995, with covers and links
 New Zealand Book Awards at Christchurch City Libraries, 1976–1995, with covers and links
 Goodman Fielder Wattie Book Awards at Christchurch City Libraries, 1968–1993, with covers and links

New Zealand fiction awards
Awards established in 1996
1996 establishments in New Zealand
New Zealand poetry awards
New Zealand non-fiction literary awards